XDrawChem is a free software program for drawing chemical structural formulas, available for Unix and macOS. It is distributed under the GNU GPL. In Microsoft Windows this program is called WinDrawChem.

Major features 
 Fixed length and fixed angle drawing
 Automatic alignment of figures
 Detection of structures, text, and arrows, and their automatic placement
 Can automatically draw rings and other structures - has all standard amino acids and nucleic acids in a built-in library
 Retrieval of structures from a network database based on CAS number, formula, or name
 Retrieval of information on a molecule based on a drawing
 Symbols such as partial charge and radicals
 Reading MDL Molfiles, CML (Chemical Markup Language), ChemDraw binary format, ChemDraw XML text format
 Writing MDL Molfiles, CML, ChemDraw XML text format
 Integration with OpenBabel, allowing XDrawChem to read and write over 20 different chemical file formats.
 Image export in Portable Network Graphics (PNG), Windows bitmap, Encapsulated PostScript (EPS), and Scalable Vector Graphics (SVG)
 3D structure generation with the help of the external program BUILD3D
 Simple spectra predictions, including 13C-NMR, 1H-NMR (based on additive rules and functional group lookup methods), and IR
 Simple property estimation, including pKa, octanol-water partition coefficient, and gas-phase enthalpy change.

See also
 ChemDraw – popular, proprietary chemical editor

External links 
 XDrawChem at SourceForge

Free science software
Free software programmed in C++
Free software programmed in Fortran
Science software that uses Qt
Chemistry software for Linux